Paulding may refer to:


Places
Antarctica
Paulding Bay
United States
Paulding, Michigan, an unincorporated community
Paulding, Mississippi, an unincorporated community
Paulding, Missouri, a ghost town
Paulding, Ohio, a village
Paulding County, Georgia
Paulding County, Ohio

US Navy ships
Paulding-class destroyer, a class of 21 ships
USS Paulding (DD-22), lead ship of the class
USS James K. Paulding (DD-238), a US Navy destroyer

People
Paulding (surname)
Paulding Farnham (1859–1927), American jewelry designer, sculptor and metallurgist who worked for Tiffany & Co.

Other uses
Ruth Paulding Middle School, California

See also
Paulding Light, a light seen in a valley outside Paulding, Michigan; thought to have been supernatural, but later proven to be car headlights